Estonia is a country in Northern Europe.

The same country, or larger part of it, has also been referred to as:
 Danish Estonia, a dominion of Denmark (1219–1346)
 Swedish Estonia, a dominion of Sweden (1561–1721)
 Governorate of Estonia, a province of the Russian Empire (1796–1917)
 Estonian SSR, an administrative subunit of the Soviet Union (1940–1941, 1944–1990)
 Estonia electoral district (Russian Constituent Assembly election, 1917)
 Estonia (European Parliament constituency)

Estonia may also refer to:

 Estonia (organization)
 Estonia (piano), a piano brand
 Estonia Piano Factory, manufacturers of the Estonia piano
 Estonia (race car), a race car brand
 "Estonia" (song), a song by Marillion
 1541 Estonia, an asteroid
 MS Estonia, a ship that sank in the Baltic Sea in 1994
 SS Czar or SS Estonia

See also 
 Astonia, a monotypic genus of plants
 Estonian (disambiguation)
 Estonia Theatre, an opera house and concert hall in Tallinn